Defne Samyeli (born 17 March 1972) is a Turkish TV presenter, columnist, singer and actress.

Life 
Samyeli was born as the first child of an Istanbul admiral Haluk and hotel manager Sendegül who is from Adana's Ramazanoğullar family. In 1991, she ranked third on Turkey's beauty pageant.

Samyeli, who started her career as a journalist and graduated from Boğaziçi University, was a news reporter in the main news bulletin of Kanal D under the direction of Tuncay Özkan. She received 2 international awards for her different news presentation in the main news bulletin of Kanal D. Samyeli has been a columnist for Milliyet newspaper, the editor and presenter of Show TV's main news bulletin, and a writer for Güneş newspaper. As of May 2010 for a while she presented the program Defne Her şey Bambaşka on ATV. Samyeli who worked as a columnist for Milliyet for so many years, parted her ways from the newspaper on 3 January 2015.

Filmography

Film 
 2023: Prestij Meselesi

TV programs 
 1991–1994: Salı Pazarı (Star TV)
 1992–1993: İyi Günler Türkiye (Star TV)
 1994: Pazar Show (Show TV)
 1994–1995: Show'da Show (Show TV)
 1996: Şakalamaca (Kanal D)
 1996–1999: Defne Samyeli ile Gecenin İçinden (Kanal D)
 1998: Defne Samyeli ile Flaş Haber (Kanal D)
 1999–2002: Kanal D Ana Haber Bülteni (Kanal D)
 2002: Seçim 2002 (Show TV)
 2002–2007: Show TV Ana Haber Bülteni (Show TV)
 2004: Seçim 2004 (Show TV)
 2006: Vizyon (Show TV)
 2007: Seçim 2007 (Show TV)
 2010: Herşey Bambaşka (ATV)
 2011: 45 Dakika (A Haber)
 2011: Söz Teması (A Haber)

TV series 
 2013: Babam Sınıfta Kaldı (Çiğdem) (Fox TV)
 2015–2016: Kurtlar Vadisi Pusu (Asya/Zeynep) (Kanal D)
 2018: İstanbullu Gelin (Star TV)
 2020: Hekimoğlu (Kanal D)
 2020–2021: Sol Yanım (Asena) (Star TV)

Discography
 1994 – Tek Başına
 2015 – Son Arzum (single)
 2019 – Ağla Ağla (single)
 2022 – Abidin (single)

Newspapers she has written for 
 2000: Milliyet
 2002–2009: Güneş
 2013–2015: Milliyet

TV channels she has worked for 
 1991–1994: Star TV
 1994: Teleon TV
 1994–1995: Show TV
 1996–2002: Kanal D
 2002–2007: Show TV
 2010: ATV
 2011: A Haber

References 

Turkish television presenters
Boğaziçi University alumni
Turkish television actresses
1972 births
Living people
21st-century Turkish singers
21st-century Turkish women singers
Turkish women television presenters